Manuel Díaz (born 25 September 1899, date of death unknown) was a Mexican cyclist. He competed in the individual road race at the 1932 Summer Olympics.

References

External links
 

1899 births
Year of death missing
Mexican male cyclists
Olympic cyclists of Mexico
Cyclists at the 1932 Summer Olympics
Sportspeople from Aguascalientes